Helen Portugal is an American bridge player.

Bridge accomplishments

Wins

 North American Bridge Championships (6)
 Chicago Mixed Board-a-Match (1) 1962 
 Hilliard Mixed Pairs (2) 1951, 1953 
 Smith Life Master Women's Pairs (1) 1961 
 Wagar Women's Knockout Teams (1) 1969 
 von Zedtwitz Life Master Pairs (1) 1960

Runners-up

 World Olympiad Women's Teams Championship (1) 1964
 North American Bridge Championships (5)
 Vanderbilt (1) 1964 
 Wagar Women's Knockout Teams (3) 1959, 1963, 1964 
 Women's Pairs (1958-62) (1) 1961

Notes

External links
 

American contract bridge players
Living people
Year of birth missing (living people)